Poppyseed oil (also poppy seed oil and poppy oil) is an edible oil obtained from poppy seeds (specifically seeds of Papaver somniferum, the opium poppy).

Poppy seeds yield 45–50% oil.  Like poppy seeds, poppyseed oil is highly palatable, high in vitamin E, and has no narcotic properties.  Poppy seeds are especially high in tocopherols other than vitamin E (alpha-tocopherol).  Compared to other vegetable oils, poppyseed oil has a moderate amount of phytosterols:  higher than soybean oil and peanut oil, lower than safflower oil, sesame oil, wheat germ oil, corn oil, and rice bran oil. It has little or no odor and a pleasant taste, and it is less likely than some other oils to become rancid.

Uses
The oil is sometimes used as a cooking oil; it is also used for moisturizing skin.  Its primary use, however, is in the manufacture of paints, varnishes, and soaps.

Poppyseed oil is a drying oil.  In oil painting, the most popular oil for binding pigment, thinning paint, and varnishing finished paintings is linseed oil.  Walnut oil and poppyseed oil are also favored by oil painters, though each oil is used for a different purpose.   Poppyseed oil is used especially in white paints. Up through the late 19th century, when these oils became available prepared in tubes, painters tended to prepare them by hand.

While poppyseed oil does not leave the unwanted yellow tint for which linseed oil is known, it is much weaker in the test of time than the contemporary linseed oil.  Poppyseed oil dries much more slowly (5–7 days) than linseed oil (3–5 days).  For this reason poppyseed oil should not be used for a ground layer of a painting, and linseed oil should not be painted over a layer of poppyseed oil.

Poppyseed oil is the basis of lipiodol, a radiocontrast agent used in medical radiology.

History
An early 20th century industry manual states that while the opium poppy was grown extensively in Eurasia, most of the world production of poppyseed oil occurred in France and Germany, from poppy seeds imported from other countries.  From 1900 to 1911, France and Germany together produced on the order of 60,000,000 kilograms per year.  At that time, poppyseed oil was used primarily to dress salads and frequently was adulterated with sesame oil and hazelnut oil to improve the taste of oil from stored (rancid) seeds.  Poppyseed oil was used to adulterate olive oil and peach kernel oil.

See also
Fat over lean

References 
 Rosenblum, E. E. (2009). "poppy". Grolier Multimedia Encyclopedia. Retrieved 14 July 2009, from Grolier Online 

Poppy seeds
Cooking oils
Vegetable oils
Painting materials